The Kobe Shimbun Hai (Japanese 神戸新聞杯) is a Japanese Grade 2 flat horse race in Japan for three-year-old Thoroughbreds. It is run over a distance of 2400 metres at Hanshin Racecourse in September, but was contested over 2000 metres until 2006.

The Kobe Shimbun Hai was first run in 1953 and was elevated to Grade 2 status in 1984. It serves as a trial race for the Kikuka Sho. Winners of the race have included Deep Impact, Zenno Rob Roy and Orfevre.

Winners since 2000 

 The 2020 race took place at Chukyo Racecourse over 2200 metres.

Earlier winners

 1984 - Daizen Silver
 1985 - Speed Hero
 1986 - Takeno Komayoshi
 1987 - Max Beauty
 1988 - Yaeno Dia
 1989 - Osaichi George
 1990 - Center Shokatsu
 1991 - Long Title
 1992 - Kyoei Bowgun
 1993 - Biwa Hayahide
 1994 - Star Man
 1995 - Tanino Create
 1996 - Shirokita Cross
 1997 - Matikanefukukitaru
 1998 - Kenetoshi Governor
 1999 - Osumi Bright

See also
 Horse racing in Japan
 List of Japanese flat horse races

References

Turf races in Japan